Xylotrechus aceris is a species of beetle in the family Cerambycidae. It was described by Fisher in 1917.

References

Xylotrechus
Beetles described in 1917